Preparedness Act may refer to:

 Special Preparedness Fund Act of 1917 (U.S.)
 Pandemic Preparedness and Response Act (U.S.) of 2005
 Public Readiness and Emergency Preparedness Act (U.S.) of 2005
 Pandemic and All-Hazards Preparedness Act (U.S.) of 2006
 Pandemic and All-Hazards Preparedness Reauthorization Act of 2013 (U.S.)
 Pandemic and All-Hazards Preparedness and Advancing Innovation Act (U.S.) of 2019
 Coronavirus Preparedness and Response Supplemental Appropriations Act, 2020 (U.S.)

See also
Preparedness (disambiguation)